Tlungvel is a large village located in Thingsulthliah Block of Aizawl district, Mizoram.

Demographics
A total 559 families reside in Tlungvel. Tlungvel has population of 2529 of which 1238 are males while 1291 are females as per Population Census 2011.

In Tlungvel the population of children with age 0-6 is 339 which makes up 13.40% of total population of village. Average Sex Ratio of Tlungvel is 1043 which is higher than Mizoram state average of 976. Child Sex Ratio for Tlungvel as per census is 994, higher than Mizoram average of 970.

Literacy
Tlungvel village has higher literacy rate compared to Mizoram. In 2011, literacy rate of Tlungvel was 97.17% compared to 91.33% of Mizoram. In Tlungvel Male literacy stands at 96.72% while female literacy rate was 97.59%.

Administration
As per constitution of India and Panchayati Raj Act, Tlungvel is administrated by the Village Council Head who is elected representative of the villagers.

Education
Tlungvel has four primary schools, two middle schools and a high school all run by the state government. It also has one English Medium school run by the Presbyterian Church and a government lump-sum aided Higher Secondary school.
It has also one Computer Learning Centre, Located at Venghlun, Tlungvel Near Presbyterian Churh of Mizoram, Tlungvel Venghlun, Run by Upa RM Zahlira and family.

Healthcare
There is a Primary Health Sub-Centre within the village. The Community Health Centre located at the adjoining village of Thingsulthliah is the nearest hospital that can be accessed by the villagers.

References

Villages in Aizawl district